The 2012 Ladies European Tour was a series of golf tournaments for elite female golfers from around the world which took place from February through December 2012. The tournaments were sanctioned by the Ladies European Tour (LET).

The tour featured 24 official money events. Carlota Ciganda, a rookie, won the Order of Merit with earnings of €251,290. She was also named Player of the Year and Rookie of the Year.

The season was the first since 1983 not to include an event in the Nordic countries. The South African Women's Open was included for the first time. while the Ladies Open of Portugal was dropped from the schedule, having been a fixture since 2002. The Ladies British Masters, not played since 2001, was re-introduced, now with ISPS Handa as title sponsor. 

The European Nations Cup was succeeded as team event by the World Ladies Championship.

Schedule
The numbers in brackets after the winners' names indicate the career wins on the Ladies European Tour, including that event, and is only shown for members of the tour.

Key

Order of Merit rankings

External links
Official site of the Ladies European Tour
Ladies European Tour Information Centre

Ladies European Tour
Ladies European Tour
Ladies European Tour